Tuff is a ghost town in Bandera County, in the U.S. state of Texas, in the Texas Hill Country, which is part of the Edwards Plateau. It is considered part of the San Antonio Metropolitan Statistical Area.

History
Tuff also went by the name of Crockett. A post office was established at Tuff in 1901 and remained in operation until 1926, with Ola Adams as postmistress. Mail was then sent to the community from the Medina post office. It had a general store and 50 residents in 1914, which went down to 10 by 1925. Tuff was not shown on county maps in the 1940s, but log cabins were renovated in the 1990s. The community became a ghost town by 2000.

Geography

Education
The community's first school was built on a land grant donated by Andy Crockett in 1883. It joined the Medina Independent School District in 1930. The community continues to be served by the Medina ISD today.

References

Unincorporated communities in Bandera County, Texas
Greater San Antonio
Unincorporated communities in Texas